Vanilla planifolia is a species of vanilla orchid. The vanilla genus has roughly 110 species in it . It is native to Mexico and Belize. It is one of the primary sources for vanilla flavouring, due to its high vanillin content. Common names include flat-leaved vanilla, and  West Indian vanilla (also used for the Pompona vanilla, V. pompona). Often, it is simply referred to as "the vanilla". It was first scientifically named in 1808. With the species' population in decline and its habitats being converted to other purposes, the IUCN has assessed Vanilla planifolia as Endangered.

Habitat
It prefers hot, wet, tropical climates.
 
It is cultivated and harvested primarily in Veracruz, Mexico, Tahiti, Indonesia, and Madagascar.

Description
Vanilla planifolia grows as an evergreen vine, either on the ground or on trees. In the wild it easily grows to 15 meters in length, and may grow to as much as 30 meters. To cling to trees or other surfaces it has thick, fleshy aerial roots that develop from the nodes of its succulent vine. On the nodes opposite the root nodes it has a single flat bladed succulent leaf.

Flowers

The flowers come from an axillary cluster that will have 12–20 buds. The flowers are greenish-yellow, with a diameter of 5 cm (2 in) and only have a slight scent. The flowers open in the morning and last only one day and require pollination to set fruit. The plants are self-fertile, and pollination simply requires a transfer of the pollen from the anther to the stigma. If pollination does not occur, the flower is dropped the next day. In the wild, there is less than 1% chance that the flowers will be pollinated, so in order to receive a steady flow of fruit, the flowers must be hand-pollinated when grown on farms.

Fruit
Fruit is produced only on mature plants, which are generally over 3 m (10 ft) long. The fruits are 15–23 cm (6–9 in) long pods (often incorrectly called beans).  Outwardly they resemble small bananas. They mature after about five months, at which point they are harvested and cured. Curing ferments and dries the pods while minimizing the loss of essential oils. Vanilla extract is obtained from this portion of the plant.

Ecology
In its native habitat Vanilla planifolia depends on one or more pollinators. Several species of bee have been proposed including Euglossa viridissima, Eulaema cingulata, Eulaema polychroma, Eulaema meriana, and Melipona beecheii for pollination. However, no definitive observation of pollination is recorded and the size of M. beecheii in particular make it unlikely to be a pollinator of this species of orchid, though unpublished observations have been made of E. viridissima completing pollination. This species live in different habitats due to the increase of human activity. Due to human interactions migration rate of northern Mexican plants migrate into the Southern Volcanic Belt.

Chemistry
The major chemical components from the pods are vanillin, vanillic acid, 4-hydroxybenzaldehyde and 4-hydroxybenzoic acid.

Contact dermatitis

When propagating vanilla orchids from cuttings or harvesting ripe vanilla pods, care must be taken to avoid contact with the sap from the plant's stems.  The sap of most species of Vanilla orchid which exudes from cut stems or where pods are harvested can cause moderate to severe dermatitis if it comes in contact with bare skin.  Washing the affected area with warm soapy water will effectively remove the sap in cases of accidental contact with the skin.  The sap of vanilla orchids contains calcium oxalate crystals, which appear to be the main causative agent of contact dermatitis in vanilla plantation workers.

See also
 Vanilla tahitensis

References

[1] Fouché, J. G., & Jouve, L. (1999). Vanilla planifolia: history, botany and culture in Reunion island. Agronomie, 19(8), 689-703.
[2] Schlüter, P. M., Soto Arenas, M. A., & Harris, S. A. (2007). Genetic Variation in Vanilla planifolia (Orchidaceae). Economic Botany, 61(4), 328–336. https://doi.org/10.1663/0013-0001(2007)61[328:gvivpo]2.0.co;2

External links
	

planifolia
Flora of Mexico
Flora of Belize
Crops originating from Mexico
Plants described in 1808
Taxa named by Henry Cranke Andrews